Created from the former Collins and Ludowici Railroad, the Collins and Glennville Railroad was founded in 1921 and operated  of track between Collins and Glennville, Georgia, USA.  The railroad lasted until 1941 when it was abandoned.

Defunct Georgia (U.S. state) railroads
Railway companies established in 1921
1941 disestablishments in Georgia (U.S. state)
Railway lines closed in 1941
American companies established in 1921